Prepotential may refer to:

In medicine, the tendency for the action potential of cardiac cell membranes to drift towards threshold following repolarization
In mathematics, the vector superfield in supersymmetric gauge theory